V.League 2 or Vietnamese National Football First League,, also called Gold Star V.League 2 for sponsorship reasons, is the second tier professional association football league in Vietnam controlled by the Vietnam Professional Football. V.League 2 has 12 teams competing in this season.

Format 
Initially the V.League 2 comprised 14 clubs. Starting in the 2022 season, only 12 teams will participate in the V.League 2. Over the course of a season, clubs play a two-leg round-robin format over 22 rounds with a total of 132 matches. The club finishing at the bottom of the league table will be relegated to the Vietnam League Two while the top 2 clubs will be promoted to the V.League 1.

Current clubs

Stadiums and locations

Note: Table lists in alphabetical order.

Number of teams by region

Personnel and kits

Managerial changes

List of seasons 
{| class="wikitable"
|-
! Season
! Champions
! Runner-up
! Third Place
|-
| 2001
| Bình Định
| Đà Nẵng
| Hải Quan
|-
| 2002
| Gạch Đồng Tâm Long An
| Đồng Tháp
| Hoàng Anh Gia Lai
|-
| 2003
| Hải Phòng
| Bình Dương
| Thanh Hóa
|-
| 2004
| Cảng Sài Gòn
| Hòa Phát Hà Nội
| Thừa Thiên Huế
|-
| 2005
| Khatoco Khánh Hòa
| Tiền Giang
| Đông Á
|-
| 2006
| Đồng Tháp
| Thanh Hóa
| Huda Huế
|-
| 2007
| Thể Công
| Vạn Hoa Hải Phòng
| An Giang
|-
| 2008
| Quân khu 4
| Hà Nội T&T
| Cao su Đồng Tháp
|-
| 2009
| Vissai Ninh Bình
| Hòa Phát Hà Nội
| XSKT Cần Thơ
|-
| 2010
| Hà Nội ACB
| Than Quảng Ninh
| SQC Bình Định
|-
| 2011
| Sài Gòn Xuân Thành
| Kienlongbank Kiên Giang
| SQC Bình Định
|-
| 2012
| Đồng Tâm Long An
| Hà Nội
| Đồng Nai
|-
| 2013
| QNK Quảng Nam
| Than Quảng Ninh
| Hùng Vương An Giang
|-
| 2014
| TĐCS Đồng Tháp
| Sanna Khánh Hòa BVN
| XSKT Cần Thơ
|-
| 2015
| Hà Nội
| Huế
| TP Hồ Chí Minh
|-
| 2016
| TP Hồ Chí Minh
| Viettel
| Nam Định
|-
| 2017
| Nam Định
| Huế
| Bình Phước
|-
| 2018
| Viettel
| Hà Nội B
| Đồng Tháp
|-
| 2019
| Hong Linh Ha Tinh
| Pho Hien
| Binh Phuoc
|-
| 2020
| Binh Dinh
| Ba Ria Vung Tau
| Sanna Khanh Hoa BVN
|-
| 2021
|align=center colspan=3|Competition abandoned due to COVID-19 pandemic in Vietnam
|-
| 2022
| Cong An Nhan Dan
| Khanh Hoa
| Quang Nam

Top scorers

References

External links 
 

 
2
Second level football leagues in Asia
Sports leagues established in 2000